This is a list of the administrative divisions of the municipality of Santa Maria, in the Brazilian state of Rio Grande do Sul.

Districts
The municipality is divided into 10 districts:

Apart from the 1st District, all the others are administered by Subprefects (subprefeitos), each of them appointed by the municipal Mayor.

Bairros and Administrative Regions

Santa Maria is officially organized in 50 bairros ("neighborhoods"), 41 of which are located in the 1st District of Sede ("Seat"), which accounts for 94.4% of the total population in the municipality. The remaining 9 bairros are coextensive with the 9 rural districts.

The 41 bairros of the Seat District are further grouped into 8 regiões administrativas (or R.A., "administrative regions").

External links
Political Map of Santa Maria (.pdf) 
 The City's Official Website

Geography of Rio Grande do Sul